The Spanish Cross Country Championships is an annual cross country running organised by the Royal Spanish Athletics Federation (RFEA) that serves as the national championship for the sport in Spain. It is usually held in February or March. 

It was first held in 1916 for men only and a women's race was added to the programme in 1965. A team element was present in the competition, decided by the finishing places of a team's top four runners. This was initially contested by federal territory, then by province from 1959–1985, and by autonomous community from 1986 onwards. An under-20 (junior) race was added for men in 1956 and a women's under-20 race in 1978. An under-23 (promesa) race for both men and women. A short race was held from 2002 to 2006 to align with national selection for that section at the IAAF World Cross Country Championships.

Editions

Winners

Men

Women

References

List of winners
National Crosscountry Champions for Spain. Association of Road Racing Statisticians (2017-10-28). Retrieved 2020-06-29.

External links
Royal Spanish Athletics Federation website

National cross country running competitions
Athletics competitions in Spain
Annual sporting events in Spain
Recurring sporting events established in 1916
1916 establishments in Spain
Cross country running in Spain